Romeo Harizaj (born 26 September 1998) is an Albanian professional footballer who plays as a goalkeeper for Albanian Superliga club Dinamo Tirana.

External links

Romeo Harizaj at the Albanian Football Association

1998 births
Living people
People from Mallakastër
Albanian footballers
Association football goalkeepers
Kategoria Superiore players
Kategoria e Parë players
Albania youth international footballers
Albania under-21 international footballers
KF Apolonia Fier players
KS Albpetrol Patos players
FK Dinamo Tirana players
Kategoria e Dytë players